Leontius (–  15 February 706), was Byzantine emperor from 695 to 698. Little is known of his early life, other than that he was born in Isauria in Asia Minor. He was given the title of patrikios, and made strategos of the Anatolic Theme under Emperor Constantine IV. He led forces against the Umayyads during the early years of Justinian II's reign, securing victory and forcing the Umayyad caliph, Abd al-Malik ibn Marwan, to sue for peace.

In 692, Justinian declared war upon the Umayyads again, and sent Leontius to campaign against them. However, he was defeated decisively at the Battle of Sebastopolis, and imprisoned by Justinian for his failure. He was released in 695, and given the title of strategos of the Theme of Hellas in Southern Greece. After being released, he led a rebellion against Justinian, and seized power, becoming emperor in the same year.

He ruled until 697, when he was overthrown by Apsimar, a droungarios who had taken part in a failed expedition that had been launched by Leontius to recover Carthage. After seizing Constantinople, Apsimar took the name Tiberius (III), and had Leontius' nose and tongue cut off. He was sent to the Monastery of Dalmatou, where he remained until some time between August 705 and February 706. By this time Justinian had retaken the throne. Both Leontius and Tiberius were executed.

Origin and early life
Little of Leontius' early life is known, other than that he was from Isauria, and possibly of Armenian descent. He was appointed as strategos of the Anatolic Theme, at the time the most senior military command of the Byzantine Empire, and patrikios by Emperor Constantine IV, possibly  AD.

Starting in 680, the Islamic Umayyad Caliphate erupted into a civil war, known as the Second Fitna. Umayyad authority was challenged even in their metropolitan province of Syria, while most of the Caliphate recognized Abdallah ibn al-Zubayr instead. Under Marwan I and his son Abd al-Malik, however, the Umayyads gained the upper hand, although the Zubayrids were not finally defeated until 692.

The civil war in the Umayyad Caliphate provided an opportunity for the Byzantine Empire to attack its weakened rival, and, in 686, Emperor Justinian II sent Leontius to invade Umayyad territory in Armenia and Iberia, where he campaigned successfully, before leading troops into Media and Caucasian Albania; during these campaigns he gathered loot. Leontius' successful campaigns compelled the Umayyad Caliph, Abd al-Malik ibn Marwan, to sue for peace in 688, agreeing to tender part of the taxes from Umayyad territory in Armenia, Iberia, and Cyprus, and to renew a treaty signed originally under Constantine IV, providing for a weekly tribute of 1,000 pieces of gold, one horse, and one slave.

Justinian invaded the Caliphate again in 692, feeling that the Umayyads were in a weak position, but was repulsed at the Battle of Sebastopolis, where a large number of Slavs defected to the Umayyads, ensuring the Byzantine defeat. After this, the Umayyads renewed their invasion of North Africa, aimed at taking the city of Carthage in the Exarchate of Africa, and also invaded Anatolia. Around this time, Justinian imprisoned Leontius. Some Byzantine sources, such as Nikephoros and Theophanes, suggest that Justinian did so because he believed that Leontius was seeking to take the throne, but it is possible that the crushing defeat at Sebastopolis played a part in his imprisonment; as strategos of the Anatolic Theme, he likely served in the battle, and may have even been the main Byzantine commander in it.

After further setbacks in the war, Justinian released Leontius in 695 because he feared losing control of Carthage, and appointed him strategos of the Theme of Hellas in Southern Greece. During his captivity, Leontius was cared for by two monks, Gregorios and Paulos, who prophesied his rise to the throne, and encouraged him to rise against Justinian after his release. Leontius, once free, quickly raised a rebellion against Justinian. Leontius had wide support from the aristocracy, who opposed Justinian's land policies, which restricted the aristocracy's ability to acquire land from peasant freeholders, and the peasantry, who opposed Justinian's tax policies, as well as the Blue faction (one of the Hippodrome factions), and the Patriarch of Constantinople Callinicus. Leontius and his supporters seized Justinian and brought him to the Hippodrome, where Justinian's nose was cut off, a common practice in Byzantine culture, done in order to remove threats to the throne, as mutilated people were traditionally barred from becoming emperor; however, Leontius did not kill Justinian, out of reverence for Constantine IV. After Justinian's nose was cut off, Leontius exiled him to Cherson, a Byzantine exclave in the Crimea.

Reign and downfall

Upon his coronation, Leontius, now known as Leo, adopted a moderate political stance. He restricted the activity of the Byzantine army, allowing small raids against the border of the Byzantine empire to proceed without reprisal, and instead focused upon consolidation. Very little is known of his domestic policy, except that he had the port of Neorion in Constantinople cleared, which allegedly led  to a four-month outbreak of plague.

The Umayyads, emboldened by Leontius perceived weakness, invaded the Exarchate of Africa in 696, capturing Carthage in 697. Leontius sent the patrikios John to retake the city. John was able to seize Carthage after a surprise attack on its harbor. However, Umayyad reinforcements soon retook the city, forcing John to retreat to Crete and regroup. A group of officers, fearing the Emperor's punishment for their failure, revolted and proclaimed Apsimar, a droungarios (mid-level commander) of the Cibyrrhaeots, emperor.

Apsimar took the regnal name Tiberius, gathered a fleet and allied himself with the Green faction, before sailing for Constantinople, which was enduring the bubonic plague. After several months of siege, the city surrendered to Tiberius, in 698. Tiberius captured Leontius, and had his nose slit before imprisoning him in the Monastery of Dalmatou. Leontius stayed in the monastery under guard until Justinian retook the throne with the assistance of the Bulgar king Tervel in 705. Justinian then had both Leontius and Tiberius dragged to the Hippodrome and publicly humiliated, before being taken away and beheaded. The execution took place on 15 February 706 according to the Chronicon Altinate. The body of Leontius was thrown into the sea alongside Tiberius, but was later recovered and buried in a church on the island of Prote.

See also

List of Byzantine emperors

Notes

References

Citations

Bibliography

Web sources

External links 

7th-century Byzantine emperors
660s births
706 deaths
Executed Byzantine people
8th-century executions by the Byzantine Empire
Byzantine prisoners and detainees
Twenty Years' Anarchy
8th-century Byzantine people
690s in the Byzantine Empire
700s in the Byzantine Empire
Byzantine governors of Hellas
Governors of the Anatolic Theme
Patricii
Executed monarchs
People executed by decapitation